1836 election may refer to:
Chilean presidential election, 1836
1836 United States presidential election
1836 United States House of Representatives elections